Guillaumin is a French surname. Notable people with the surname include:

Armand Guillaumin (1842–1927), French impressionist painter and lithographer
André Guillaumin (1885–1974), French botanist
Colette Guillaumin (1934–2017), French sociologist

French-language surnames